Defending champion Rafael Nadal defeated Roger Federer in the final, 1–6, 6–1, 6–4, 7–6(7–4), to win the men's singles tennis title at the 2006 French Open. It was his second French Open title and second major title overall. It was the first of three consecutive years Nadal and Federer would contest the French Open final. This marked Federer's first defeat in a major final; he was attempting to complete the career Grand Slam and to become the first man since Rod Laver in 1969 to hold all four major titles at once, having won the preceding Wimbledon, US Open and Australian Open titles. The latter feat would ultimately be achieved a decade later by Novak Djokovic, at the same tournament, who here reached the quarterfinals at a major for the first time.

The tournament marked the first appearance of future US Open champion Juan Martín del Potro in a major main draw. It also saw the first match contested between Djokovic and Nadal, who would go on to play an Open Era record 59 matches against each other.

Seeds

Qualifying

Draw

Finals

Top half

Section 1

Section 2

Section 3

Section 4

Bottom half

Section 5

Section 6

Section 7

Section 8

External links
Official Roland Garros 2006 Men's Singles Draw
Main Draw
Qualifying Draw
2006 French Open – Men's draws and results at the International Tennis Federation

Men's Singles
French Open by year – Men's singles
2006 ATP Tour